Ocean Keys Shopping Centre is a shopping centre located in the Perth suburb of Clarkson, approximately  from Perth CBD, in Western Australia. Ocean Keys has over 120 stores, including Coles, Kmart, City Beach, and JB Hi-Fi.

Ocean Keys is owned and managed by AMP Capital.

History and development

2001	Stage 1 of the centre opened on June 25, 2001, consisting of two supermarkets (Coles & Newmart) and 35 speciality stores.

2005	Stage 2 extension of the centre opened in October 2005 introducing Kmart and an additional 42 speciality shops.

2006	AMP Capital Shopping Centres commenced management of the centre.

2007 	Construction of the Stage 4 development commenced in April 2007 and was completed in November of the same year.

2013	Construction commenced on the Stage 5 development in January 2013 to increase the centre GLA to  through the addition of Target, approximately 50 new speciality stores and a new three level car park across a two-year program.

2014	The redevelopment was completed in two stages in 2014 – Stage 1 opened on 20 March 2014 and Stage 2 opened on 6 November 2014.

2020	After 6 years, in October 2020, Target closed down and was shortly replaced temporarily by a second Kmart store, however, this was until August 2021.

Architectural features
The architectural design of the redevelopment was informed by both its history and surroundings. Themes from the original pre-developed shopping centre were refreshed, with the replication of motifs from the artificial environment at the nearby Mindarie Marina. The colour palette is light and clean, with a focus on blue hues and shades of white, with measured use of natural and tactile materials. The redevelopment won the Commercial Architecture prize at the Australian Institute of Architects (WA chapter) awards in 2015.

References

External links

Shopping centres in Perth, Western Australia